Guadalupe pipefish, Syngnathus insulae, is a pipefish species, inhabits the Eastern Central Pacific, endemic to Guadalupe Island in Mexico. Marine subtropical demersal fish, up to  length.

References

Syngnathus
Fish of Mexican Pacific coast
Endemic fish of Mexico
Western North American coastal fauna
Fish described in 1980